Kane Leo Wilson (born 11 March 2000) is an English professional footballer who plays as a right-back for EFL Championship club Bristol City.

Club career

West Bromwich Albion
Wilson came to West Bromwich Albion at the age of 7, alongside Sam Field, and they were joined by Jonathan Leko three years later: all made their professional debuts in 2016. Wilson spent most of the 2015–16 season in their under-18 team, making only three appearances in the under-21 team, all as a substitute. However, he was fast-tracked into the first team for their summer tour to Austria. He played his first senior game against Paris Saint-Germain and his first start against Torquay United.

Wilson made his competitive debut in the EFL Cup first round away to Northampton Town on 23 August 2016, coming on in the 70th minute for fellow debutant Brendan Galloway. The game ended as a 2–2 draw which his team lost 4–3 on penalties.

Five days after his debut, Wilson was named in West Brom's squad for their Premier League game against Middlesbrough at The Hawthorns. Had he come onto the pitch, he would have been the league's first player born in the 2000s.

Exeter City loan
Wilson joined Exeter City on loan for five months on the summer transfer deadline day. He did not make his league debut until 28 October, in a 1–1 draw at Mansfield Town. He was sent off on his debut for accumulating two yellow cards, being given his marching orders in the 93rd minute.

Tranmere Rovers loan
On 9 August 2019, Wilson joined Tranmere Rovers on loan until January 2020, making his debut the next day in a 2–0 loss to Portsmouth

Forest Green Rovers
Wilson signed permanently with Forest Green Rovers on a two-year deal on 8 July 2020.

The 2021–22 season brought success for Wilson on both a club and individual level. With promotion to League One secured for the first time in the club's history after a 0–0 draw with Bristol Rovers, Wilson was awarded the League Two Player of the Season award the following day at the 2022 EFL Awards as well as being named in the 2021–22 League Two Team of the Season.

Bristol City

On 10 June 2022, Wilson signed a three year contract for Championship team Bristol City.

International career
Wilson has represented England at U16 and U17 level. In October 2016, Wilson represented England U17 in a 5–0 win over Croatia and an 8–1 win over Germany.

Personal life
Wilson received his GCSE results in the week before his professional debut. His grades were two A's, four B's and five C's.

Career statistics

Honours
Forest Green Rovers
League Two: 2021–22

Individual
EFL League Two Player of the Season: 2021–22
EFL League Two Team of the Season: 2021–22
 PFA Team of the Year: League Two 2021–22

References

External links
England profile at The FA

2000 births
Living people
Footballers from Birmingham, West Midlands
English footballers
England youth international footballers
Association football defenders
West Bromwich Albion F.C. players
Exeter City F.C. players
Walsall F.C. players
Tranmere Rovers F.C. players
Forest Green Rovers F.C. players
Bristol City F.C. players
English Football League players